Céline Marie-Claire Amaudruz ( born 15 March 1979) is a Swiss banker, attorney and politician. She currently serves as a member of the National Council (Switzerland) for the Swiss People's Party since 5 December 2011. Amaudruz previously served as president of the Grand Council of Geneva between 2010 and 2016. She is among the richest Swiss politicians in the legislative estimated by Handelszeitung.

Early life and education 
Amaudruz was born 15 March 1979 in Geneva, Switzerland, the youngest daughter of attorney Michel Max Amaudruz (1939-2022) and his wife Dominique (née Guiramand), into an industrial/law family. She has one sister. Her father was an attorney, member of the Grand Council of Geneva for the Swiss People's Party and controlling majority owner of Groupe Minoteries, a flour mill concern, which is based in Valbroye, Switzerland. He has been listed as a reputable lawyer by Martindale-Hubell. 

She studied law at the University of Geneva (Licentiate) and a Master of Business Administration (MBA) from IMD Business School.

Career 
Initially, she spent six years for her parents, both practicing lawyers. She worked for the law firm Poncet Turrettini Amaudruz Neyroud & Associes in Geneva during her studies, in which her father was a partner. Later she engaged in wealth management at UBS and Julius Bär. Amaudruz currently works as a relationship manager in wealth management for REYL & Cie, a private bank in Geneva. 

Amaudruz currently serves on the board of directors of Steiner Mühle in Lauperswil, TP Publicité SA, Groupe Minoteries SA and Transport public genevois (TPG) in Lancy. She is on the board of trustees of Fondation de prévoyance en faveur du personel tpg and Fondation de prévoyange en faveur du personel du groupe Minoteries SA (both private pension funds).

Politics 
Amaudruz began her political career while serving in the Grand Council of Geneva between October 2009 and October 2011. She was ultimately elected into the National Council (Switzerland) for the Swiss People's Party during the 2011 Swiss federal election and subsequently reelected in the 2015 Swiss federal election. Between 2011 and 2015, she simultaneously served on the municipal council of Puplinge, Switzerland. She was also cantonal president of the Swiss People's Party in Geneva from 2010 to 2016. Since 2016 she is vice president of the Swiss People's Party.

She is the richest politician in the Swiss

legislative from French-speaking Switzerland.

Personal life 
In 2021, Amaudruz married Michael Andersen (b. c. 1991), in Geneva. They reside in Vandoevres, where Andersen serves on the municipal council for the Swiss People's Party.

References 

1979 births
Living people
Swiss politicians